Ephyra may refer to:

Places
 The ancient city of Cichyrus in Thesprotia, later known as Ephyra
 Ephyra (Aetolia), a city of ancient Aetolia
 Ephyra (Arcadia), a town of ancient Arcadia
 Ephyra (Elis), a city of ancient Elis
 Ephyra (Sicyonia), a city of ancient Sicyonia
 Efyra, a village and an archeological site in Elis, Greece
 Ephyra, ancient name of Ancient Corinth, Greece
 Ephyra, ancient name of Cranon, Thessaly, Greece

Other uses
 Ephyra, one of the Oceanids
 Ephyra, one of the Nereids
 Ephyra, a stage of the life cycle of jellyfish